Behnam Yakhchali Dehkordi (born 12 july, 1995) is an Iranian professional basketball player who last played for the  شهرداری گرگان of the Iranian Basketball league. He has played for the Iranian national basketball team.

References

External links
Asia-Basket profile
Moosefreezer profile

1995 births
Living people
2014 FIBA Basketball World Cup players
2019 FIBA Basketball World Cup players
Asian Games medalists in basketball
Asian Games silver medalists for Iran
Basketball players at the 2014 Asian Games
Basketball players at the 2018 Asian Games
Basketball players at the 2020 Summer Olympics
Iranian men's basketball players
Medalists at the 2014 Asian Games
Medalists at the 2018 Asian Games
Mitteldeutscher BC players
Olympic basketball players of Iran
Shooting guards
Small forwards
Petrochimi Bandar Imam BC players
Rostock Seawolves players